Stoke Pero Church in Stoke Pero, Somerset, England was built in the 13th century. It is a Grade II* listed building.

History

The church has no known dedication to any saint, however an inscription on one of the three bells suggests it may have been dedicated to Saint Barbara.

The tower dates from the 13th century. The rest of the church was largely rebuilt in 1897 by Sir Thomas Dyke Acland, 12th Baronet. It is likely that there was a church on the site long before the 13th century.

The list of rectors goes back to 1242.

Occasional services are held at the church by the parish of Porlock with Stoke Pero which is within the Diocese of Bath and Wells.

Architecture

The stone building has slate roofs. It consists of a three-bay nave and chancel with a porch to the north. The tower is supported by diagonal buttresses and has a stair turret. It has no electricity supply and is lit by candles and warmed by fuel-stoves.

Inside the church is a baluster font.

See also

 List of ecclesiastical parishes in the Diocese of Bath and Wells

References

Grade II* listed buildings in West Somerset
Grade II* listed churches in Somerset